Chrystalla Georghadji (Famagusta, Cyprus, 13 July 1956) is Cypriot economist who served as governor of the Central Bank of Cyprus (CBC) from 2014 until 2019. She is the first female governor of the CBC.

Career
She graduated in Economics at the University of Athens, Greece in 1978. She did a postgraduate in Economics and Econometrics at the University of Southampton.

She was Auditor General of the Republic from 1998 to 2014, an independent position which monitors public spending. On 11 April 2014, she was appointed governor of the Central Bank of Cyprus.

References

Governors of the Central Bank of Cyprus
Cypriot economists
Greek Cypriot people
1956 births
Living people